General elections were held in Belize on 30 June 1993. Although the People's United Party received the most votes, the United Democratic Party–National Alliance for Belizean Rights alliance won the most seats. Voter turnout was 72.1%.

Background
British forces, kept in Belize by agreement of its government since independence in 1981, were scheduled to leave in 1993 or 1994. There was widespread belief that Belize would fall prey to Guatemalan incursions if the British left.

The PUP won the previous election with a two-seat majority. However, by early 1993 its majority had increased to six thanks to newly elected UDP Area Rep. William Usher of Toledo West crossing the floor to the PUP days after the 1989 election, and a January 1993 by-election win in Freetown after the UDP's Derek Aikman was forced to resign due to bankruptcy. Success in the subsequent March municipal elections also gave the PUP added confidence.

Meanwhile, the UDP had been in apparent disarray since 1991, when a group led by longtime Area Rep. Philip Goldson broke with the party to form the National Alliance for Belizean Rights over disagreements on how to handle the longstanding Belizean–Guatemalan territorial dispute. This all compelled Prime Minister George Price to call elections nearly 18 months early (they were not constitutionally due until at least December 1994).

With Price's move the UDP and NABR promptly sought a coalition to achieve victory at the polls. However, Goldson was the NABR's only successful candidate. Although the PUP won a majority of votes nationwide, the UDP/NABR coalition won a slim majority of seats and therefore formed the next government. The election would be Price's last as PUP leader after over 35 years. He was succeeded as party leader in 1996 by Said Musa.

Results
The results were extremely close in several constituencies. In Caribbean Shores and Stann Creek West the UDP–NABR candidates won by 40 and 34 votes. The UDP–NABR candidate in Cayo North won by 18 votes. In Orange Walk North, the UDP–NABR won by five votes. The PUP candidate in Belize Rural North won by four votes, while the UDP–NABR candidate in Toledo East was elected by the same margin. The PUP candidate in Corozal Southwest won by three votes, while in Collet, the UDP–NABR candidate won by a single vote.

One NABR candidate, Philip Goldson, was elected.

Results by constituency

References

Belize
Belize
Legislative election
General elections in Belize
June 1993 events in North America